Ingyeo ingan, sometimes translated The Extra Mortals, is a 1964 South Korean film directed by Yu Hyun-mok. At the 2nd Blue Dragon Film Awards ceremony, the film won six awards, among them Best Film, Best Director, and Best Actor for lead Kim Jin-kyu. The film was based on a novel.

Plot
This drama tells the story of a group of men in a hospital waiting room. A dentist and a wounded war veteran are among the group. Their disgruntled conversation of their lot in life includes discussions of past love affairs and patriotism.

Cast
Kim Jin-kyu
Shin Young-kyun
Do Kum-bong
 Kim Seok-gang
Tae Hyun-sil
Park Am

References

External links

English

Korean
 
 
 

1964 films
Best Picture Blue Dragon Film Award winners
1960s Korean-language films
South Korean drama films
Films directed by Yu Hyun-mok